Idols South Africa VIII is the eighth season of South African reality interactive talent show based on the British talent show Pop Idol.

After the auditions, call backs will be held in Sun City for the golden ticket holders.

Regional auditions 
Auditions began February 2012, and were held in the following cities:

 Johannesburg and Soweto auditions were aired together on the same episode, 39 golden tickets were given between the two episodes.

Top 18 Show

The judges chose the top 18 on Sunday 15 July 2012.

Semi-final: Male

The Top 18 contestants were split into two groups male and female and performed a song of their own choice. The guys group show aired on 21 July 2012 and the girls group show air on 22 July 2012 and viewers had the week to vote for their Top 10.

Semi-final: Female

Finals

Finalists
(ages stated at time of contest)

Top 10 – Old/New School

Top 9 – Grammy Award winner
Guest Performance: John Legend

Top 8 – Song from My Birth Year

Top 7 – Soul

Top 6 – Showstopper

Top 5 – Greatest songs according to Rolling Stone Magazine

Top 4 – Homebrew

Top 3 – Theatre week (Semi-final)

Top 2 – Final (Favourite performance, Most Talkes Performance & Winner's single)
Guest Judge:Ciara

Elimination chart

Notes

References

External links
 Idols website

Season 08
2012 South African television seasons